Podavur  is a village in the Srirangam taluk of Tiruchirappalli district in Tamil Nadu, India.

Demographics 

As per the 2001 census, Podavur had a population of 2,594 with 1,301 males and 1,293 females. The sex ratio was 994 and the literacy rate, 61.79.

References 

 

Villages in Tiruchirappalli district